Giddy is a surname. Notable people with the name include:

 Davies Giddy or Davies Gilbert (1767–1839), British engineer, author and politician
 Lennox Giddy (1869-1942), South African cricketer
 Norman Giddy (1876-1909), South African cricketer
 Terry Giddy (born 1950), Australian Paralympic athlete

See also
Giddey, surname